Gellman is a surname. Notable people with the surname include:

 Barton Gellman (born 1960), American journalist and author
 Cameron Gellman (born 1998), Canadian actor
 Yani Gellman (born 1985), Canadian/American actor

See also
 Gelman
 Murray Gell-Mann, winner of 1969 Nobel Prize in physics